Central College may refer to:

Sri Lanka
 Central College (Sri Lanka), also known as Madhya Maha Vidyalaya

A-K

 Achchuveli Central College, in Achchuvel
 Akkaraipattu Muslim Central College, a school for Muslim Community
 Ananda Central College, Elpitiya
 Anuradhapura Central College, in North Central Province
 Bandaranayake Central College, Veyangoda
 Bandarawela Central College, a public school in Uva province
 Bandarawela Dharmasoka Central College, a school in Bandarawela, Badulla District
 Chenkalady Central College, a provincial school in Chenkalady
 D. S. Senanayake Central College, a school in Mirigama, Colombo District
 Galahitiyawa Central College, a school in Ganemulla, Gampaha District
 Godapitiya Central College, a national school located in Matara
 Jaffna Central College, a national school in Jaffna
 Kadayamottai Muslim Central College, a school in Madurankuli, Puttalam District
 Karandeniya Central College, a high school in Galle District of Southern Province
 Karawita Central College, in Nivitigala Division, Ratnapura District, Sabaragamuwa Province
 Kattankudy Central College, in Ceylon
 Kilinochchi Central College, a provincial school in Kilinochchi
 Kinniya Central College, a National School in Trincomalee District
 Kularathna Central College, a school in Godakawela, Ratnapura District
 Kuliyapitiya Central College, a school in Kuliyapitiya, Kurunegala District
 Kirillawala Central college,a National school in Eldeniya,Gampaha District

M-Z
 Madina Central College, a school in Madawala, Kandy District
 Mallavi Central College, a provincial school in Mallavi
 Mayurapada Central College, Dambadeniya
 Matara Central College, one of the mixed schools in Matara City
 Meesalai Veerasingam Central College, a school in Meesalai, Jaffna District
 Methodist Central College, Batticaloa
 Muslim Central College, Kalutara District
 Nalanda (Boys') Central College, a school in Minuwangoda, Gampaha District
 Nalanda (Girls') Central College, Minuwangoda
 Nelliady Central College
 Nugawela Central College, a school in Kandy District
 Omanthai Central College, a provincial school in Omanthai
 Palannoruwa Central College, a school in Gonapola, 
 Palatuwa Gunarathana Central College, in Palatuwa, Matara
 Pannawa Muslim Central College, a school in Pannawa, Kurunegala District
 Piliyandala Central College, in Piliyandala
 Pinnawala Central College, in Rambukkana 
 Polonnaruwa Royal Central College
 Poramadulla Central College, a school in Rikillagaskada, Nuwara Eliya District
 Puthukkudiyiruppu Central College, in Puthukkudiyiruppu
 Puttalam Hindu Central College, a school in Puttalam, Puttalam District
 Rajapaksha Central College, Hambantota District
 Shams Central College, Maruthamunai, a school in Maruthamunai, Ampara District
 Sivali Central College, a school in Hidellana, Ratnapura District
 Telijjawila Central College, in TelijjawilaMatara, Sri Lanka
 Thambiluvil Central College in Thambiluvil, Sri Lanka
 Tissa Central College, a school in Kalutara, Kalutara District
 Velanai Central College, in Velanai, Sri Lanka
 Vipulananda Central College, Karaitivu
 Wattegama Central College, in Wattegama, Kandy, Central Province,
 Weera Keppetipola Central College, Akuramboda, located in Akuramboda, Matale District
 Wellawa Central College, a school in Wellawa, Kurunegala District
 Wickramabahu Central College, a school in Gampola, Kandy District
 Wijayaratnam Hindu Central College, Negombo

United States
 Central College, the first name for the institution that became the University of Virginia
 Central College, a defunct college in Conway, Arkansas; see Doak S. Campbell, a president of the college
 Illinois Central College, a community college in Illinois
 North Central College, an arts college in Naperville, Illinois
 Olney Central College, a community college in Olney, Illinois
 Central College (Iowa), a private liberal arts college in Pella, Iowa, affiliated with the Reformed Church in America
 Blue Mont Central College, Manhattan, Kansas
 Central Christian College of Kansas, an evangelical Christian college in McPherson, Kansas
 South Central College, a community college in Minnesota
 Central Methodist University, Fayette, Missouri (formerly known as Central College)
 Central Female College, a former women's college in Lexington, Missouri
 East Central College, community college in Missouri
 New-York Central College, former college in McGraw, New York
 Ohio Central College, a former college in Iberia, Ohio
 Central College (Texas), a community college part of the Houston Community College System

Other countries
 Central College (Glasgow), a former public college in Glasgow, Scotland
 Central College of Bangalore, a college of science in Bangalore, India
 Central Colleges of the Philippines, Quezon City, Philippines
 St. John's Central College, in Cork City, Ireland
 Manila Central Colleges, the former name of Manila Central University, Philippines

See also
 Central State (disambiguation)
 Central University (disambiguation)